Soul Militia (known until 2002 as 2XL) is an Estonian hip-hop act, internationally most notable for winning the Eurovision Song Contest 2001 as backing singers for Tanel Padar and Dave Benton, with the song "Everybody", which they had also covered on their own in concert. The group consists of Lauri Pihlap ("Lowry"), Sergei Morgun ("Semy") and Kaido Põldma ("Craig"). A fourth member, Indrek Soom ("Ince"), left the group in 2004. 2XL was founded by Morgun and Soom in 1997. They later participated in the 2007 Estonian Eurovision preselection with a song titled "My Place".

References

External links

 Soul Militia

Estonian hip hop groups
Eurovision Song Contest winners
Eurovision Song Contest entrants for Estonia
Eurovision Song Contest entrants of 2001
Eesti Laul contestants